George Dempsey may refer to:

George Dempsey (basketball) (1929–2017), American basketball player
George Dempsey (cyclist) (1905–1985), Australian Olympic cyclist
George Dempsey (diplomat), American diplomat
George Dempsey (teacher), Irish teacher